Stygobromus ozarkensis, commonly called Ozark cave amphipod, is a troglomorphic species of amphipod in family Crangonyctidae. It is native to Arkansas, Missouri and Oklahoma in the United States.

References

Freshwater crustaceans of North America
Cave crustaceans
Crustaceans described in 1967
ozarkensis